Culberson County-Allamoore Independent School District is a public school district based in Van Horn, Texas (USA).  The district serves all of Culberson County, and eastern portions of Hudspeth County.

The district was created on July 1, 1995 by the consolidation of the Culberson County and Allamore independent school districts.

In 2009, the school district was rated "academically acceptable" by the Texas Education Agency.

Schools
Van Horn High School (Grades 9-12)
Van Horn Junior High School (Grades 6-8)
Eagle Elementary School (Grades PK-5)

References

External links

Culberson County-Allamoore ISD

School districts in Culberson County, Texas
School districts in Hudspeth County, Texas
1995 establishments in Texas
School districts established in 1995